Sidney Baxter Barham Jr. (October 19, 1872 – September 19, 1963) was an American Democratic politician who served as a member of the Virginia Senate and Virginia House of Delegates.

His father, Sidney B. Barham, served in the House of Delegates from 1893 to 1897 and again from 1903 to 1904.

References

External links

1872 births
1963 deaths
Democratic Party Virginia state senators
People from Surry County, Virginia
20th-century American politicians